Marine Tanguy (born July 5, 1989) is a French art entrepreneur who is the founder and CEO of MTArt Agency.

Early life and career 
Tanguy was born on the French island of Île de Ré. After studying philosophy at Poitiers, she moved to London at the age of 19 and interned at the BBC's The Culture Show. 

At the age of 21 Tanguy managed her first gallery, the Outsider's Gallery, in London's Soho district. Tanguy, who was two years into an art history degree at the University of Warwick at the time, dropped out of the course to take up the role.

Two years later in April 2014 Tanguy, along with investor Steph Sebbag, opened the De Re Gallery in Los Angeles.

MTArt Agency 
In June 2015, Tanguy founded MTArt Agency. 

MTArt covers their artists' studio costs, sells their works, implement cultural & commercial partnerships and offers their artists press exposure. In return, MTArt Agency gains commission on each piece the artist sells, and artists give one piece of art to the agency's private collection each year.

The agency reviews 200 portfolios of up-and-coming artists every month, with the value of the selected artists' works growing on average 150% in value year-on-year. MTArt Agency currently has offices in London and Paris.
In October 2022, an article in Le Monde detailed that several former employees, clients and business partners accused Tanguy of concealed work, tax fraud, customs fraud and moral harassment.

Personal Projects 
Tanguy is a member of the Thousand Network, the Creative Industries Federation and The Association of Women in the Arts. Tanguy also serves as a young patron of the V&A Museum and has been appointed Fellow of the Royal Society of Arts.

Tanguy has delivered two TedX talks; on how to transform cities with art (2017), and on how social media visuals affects our minds (2018).

In 2018 Tanguy was a recipient of Forbes 30 under 30 Europe: Art and Culture.

References 

1989 births
Living people
21st-century British businesswomen
French emigrants to the United Kingdom
French art critics
French women art critics
People from Charente-Maritime